The 2001 Visit Florida Tangerine Bowl was the 12th edition to the college football bowl game, succeeding the MicronPC.com bowl. It featured the NC State Wolfpack and the Pittsburgh Panthers.  This was the first year since 1982 that the Tangerine Bowl was played; the original version is now known as the Citrus Bowl.

Game summary
Scoring began in the first quarter with the two teams trading field goals.  Early in the second quarter, Pittsburgh wide receiver Antonio Bryant caught a touchdown pass on an 80-yard drive to take the lead 10–3.  On their next possession, Bryant caught another touchdown on a 99-yard drive.  North Carolina State countered with a 90-yard kickoff return for a touchdown by Gregory Golden, but the Panthers then scored another touchdown as time expired to go into halftime with a 24–10 lead.

Coming out of the half, Pittsburgh scored another field goal for the only points of the 3rd quarter to make it 27–10, but the Wolfpack put together two scoring drives for a touchdown and a field goal to make it 27–19 in the 4th.  NC State had one last opportunity to tie or take the lead on a late possession, but quarterback Philip Rivers was sacked, lost the football, and Pittsburgh scooped it up for a score, winning 34–19.

Pittsburgh - Lotz 27-yard field goal, 10:36, 1st 
North Carolina State - Kiker 32-yard field goal, 2:16, 1st 
Pittsburgh - Priestley-Bryant 15-yard pass (Lotz kick), 10:17, 2nd 
Pittsburgh - Priestley-Bryant 2-yard pass (Lotz kick), 4:06, 2nd 
North Carolina State - Greg Golden 90-yard kick return (Kiker kick), 3:48, 2nd 
Pittsburgh - Rutherford 1-yard run (Lotz kick), :20, 2nd 
Pittsburgh - Lotz 33-yard field goal, 10:22, 3rd 
North Carolina State - Rivers-Edwards 5-yard pass (kick failed), 14:56, 4th 
North Carolina State - Kiker 19-yard field goal, 9:39, 4th 
Pittsburgh - Young 16-yard fumble recovery, 6:15, 4th

References

Tangerine Bowl
Cheez-It Bowl
NC State Wolfpack football bowl games
Pittsburgh Panthers football bowl games
American football in Orlando, Florida
December 2001 sports events in the United States
Tangerine Bowl
2000s in Orlando, Florida